Gerald Nicholas Dino (January 11, 1940 – November 14, 2020) was an American hierarch of the Ruthenian Catholic Church. He was the bishop of the Byzantine Catholic Eparchy of Phoenix from 2008 to 2016.

Biography
Dino was born in 1940 in Binghamton, New York. On March 21, 1965, he was ordained a priest for the Byzantine Catholic Eparchy of Passaic. On December 6, 2007, Pope Benedict XVI appointed him bishop of the Eparchy of Van Nuys, and on March 27, 2008, he was consecrated a bishop.

At his request, Pope Benedict XVI transferred the see of the Eparchy of Van Nuys to Phoenix, Arizona in February 2010.

On reaching the age of 75, Dino submitted his resignation to Pope Francis, who accepted it and appointed his successor John Stephen Pazak in May 2016.

Dino died on November 14, 2020, aged 80.

References

External links
 Holy Protection of Mary Byzantine Catholic Eparchy of Phoenix - Official Site
 Press release of bishop's appointment

Episcopal succession

1940 births
2020 deaths
Ruthenian Catholic bishops
American Eastern Catholic bishops
People from Binghamton, New York
Religious leaders from Phoenix, Arizona
21st-century Eastern Catholic bishops
21st-century American clergy